Matthias Küfner (born 28 April 1981) is a German footballer who plays as a goalkeeper.

Küfner played as a youth for various clubs in his hometown of Bayreuth, before joining Bayern Munich at age 16. He spent three years in the youth team, before stepping up to the reserve team in 2000. He made three appearances in the 2000–01 season, his debut coming as a substitute for Stefan Wessels in a 3–0 defeat against Karlsruher SC. At the end of the season, Küfner joined Wacker Burghausen, as understudy to Kay Wehner. His first season ended with the club winning the Regionalliga Süd, which enabled him to make five appearances in the 2. Bundesliga the following year.

In 2003, Küfner returned to Munich, to join Bundesliga side 1860 München, where he spent a year as third choice 'keeper. This was followed by three years with Hallescher FC in the NOFV-Oberliga Süd, before he returned to Bavaria for a six-month spell at SpVgg Bayern Hof, then eighteen months with 1. FC Schweinfurt 05. He left Schweinfurt in 2009 to join amateur side TSV Neudrossenfeld.

References

External links

1981 births
Living people
German footballers
FC Bayern Munich II players
1. FC Schweinfurt 05 players
SV Wacker Burghausen players
Hallescher FC players
TSV 1860 Munich players
TSV 1860 Munich II players
2. Bundesliga players
Association football goalkeepers
Sportspeople from Bayreuth
Footballers from Bavaria